Norman Fucking Rockwell! is a 2019 studio album by Lana Del Rey.

Norman Fucking Rockwell! may also refer to:

 "Norman Fucking Rockwell" (song), the album's title track
 Norman Fucking Rockwell (film), an accompanying short film

See also
 NFR (disambiguation)